KNHS-LP (93.1 FM) is an American low-power FM radio station broadcasting to the Lafayette, Louisiana, area. The station is based at Northside High School.

History

On November 15, 2013, the Lafayette Parish School System applied to the Federal Communications Commission to build a new low-power FM radio station in Lafayette. The station was approved in February 2015 and immediately began broadcasting online. On August 27, KNHS-LP began transmitting. It aired a variety of student-produced programming during the day and jazz music overnight. Most music programming is centered around Cajun/zydeco music, pop, or jazz.

References

External links
 

High school radio stations in the United States
Radio stations established in 2015
Radio stations in Louisiana